Dead Souls is a novel by the Russian author Nikolai Gogol.

Dead Souls may also refer to:

Film and television
Dead Souls (1909 film), a 1909 Russian short comedy
Dead Souls (1960 film), a Soviet film based on a theatrical production of Gogol's novel, directed by Leonid Trauberg
Dead Souls (1984 film), a 1984 Soviet television miniseries adaptation of Gogol's novel, directed by Mikhail Shveytser
Dead Souls (2012 film), a 2012 horror film directed by Colin Theys
Dead Souls (2018 film), a 2018 Chinese documentary film directed by Wang Bing

"Dead Souls", an episode of the TV series Rebus, based on the Ian Rankin book

Music
Dead Souls (opera), a 1976 Russian opera based on Gogol's novel, by Rodion Shchedrin
"Dead Souls", a song by Joy Division
"Dead Souls", a song by NoMeansNo

Books
Dead Souls (Rankin novel), a 1999 Ian Rankin novel
Dead Souls, a 2017 novel by Angela Marsons

Software
Yakuza: Dead Souls, a 2011 video game